Gary Allan (born 21 June 1967) is a British born former international speedway rider from New Zealand.

Speedway career 
Allan represented New Zealand at international level and won the New Zealand Championship in 1992.

Allan rode in the top two tiers of British Speedway from 1988 to 1993, riding for various clubs. In 1993, he won the British League Division Two Riders Championship.

References 

Living people
1967 births
British speedway riders
New Zealand speedway riders
King's Lynn Stars riders
Poole Pirates riders
Swindon Robins riders
Sportspeople from Manchester